Francesco Paolo Cantelli (20 December 187521 July 1966) was an Italian mathematician. He made contributions to celestial mechanics, probability theory, and actuarial science.

Biography 
Cantelli was born in Palermo. He received his doctorate in mathematics in 1899 from the University of Palermo with a thesis on celestial mechanics and continued his interest in astronomy by working until 1903 at Palermo Astronomical Observatory (osservatorio astronomico cittadino), which was  under the direction of Annibale Riccò. Cantelli's early papers were on problems in astronomy and celestial mechanics. 

From 1903 to 1923 Cantelli worked at the Istituto di Previdenza della Cassa Depositi e Prestiti (Pension Fund for the Government Deposits and Loans Bank). During these years he did research on the mathematics of finance theory and actuarial science, as well as the probability theory. Cantelli's later work was all on probability theory. Borel–Cantelli lemma, Cantelli's inequality and the Glivenko–Cantelli theorem are result of his work in this field. In 1916–1917 he made contributions to the theory of stochastic convergence. In 1923 he resigned his actuarial position when he was appointed professor of actuarial mathematics at the University of Catania. From there, he went to the University of Naples, where he worked as a professor and then in 1931 to the Sapienza University of Rome where he remained until his retirement in 1951. He died in Rome.

Cantelli made fundamental contributions to the foundations of probability theory and to the clarification of different types of probabilistic convergence. He also made seminal contributions to actuarial science. He was the founder of the Istituto Italiano degli Attuari for the applications of mathematics and probability to economics. Cantelli was the editor of the Giornale dell'Istituto Italiano degli Attuari (GIIA) from 1930 to 1958.

Works
 Sull'adattamento delle curve ad una serie di misure o di osservazioni, Palermo, 1905
 Genesi e costruzione delle tavole di mutualità, 1914
 Sulla legge dei grandi numeri, 1916
 La tendenza a un limite nel senso del calcolo delle probabilità, 1916
 Sulla probabilità come limite della frequenza in "Rendiconti della Reale Accademia dei Lincei", 1917
 Una teoria astratta del calcolo delle probabilità, GIIA, vol. 3, pp. 257–265, Roma, 1932
 Considerazioni sulla legge uniforme dei grandi numeri e sulla generalizzazione di un fondamentale teorema del Sig. Paul Levy, 1933
 Sulla determinazione empirica delle leggi di probabilità, 1933
 Su una teoria astratta del calcolo delle probabilità e sulla sua applicazione al teorema detto "delle probabilità zero e uno", 1939

See also
 Cantelli's inequality
 Borel–Cantelli lemma
 Glivenko–Cantelli theorem

References

External links

1875 births
1966 deaths
19th-century Italian mathematicians
20th-century Italian mathematicians
Mathematicians from Sicily
Italian statisticians
University of Palermo alumni
Academic staff of the University of Catania
Academic staff of the University of Naples Federico II
Academic staff of the Sapienza University of Rome
People from Palermo
Members of the Lincean Academy
Italian actuaries
Probability theorists
Mathematical statisticians